The Triarius, a tree, is a very large Eucalyptus regnans that is located in southern Tasmania, Australia.

The tree was discovered in August 2008 by employees of Forestry Tasmania while analysing the data collected by LiDAR system used in mapping and assessment of state forest resources. The tree was discovered located in secondary forest and survived logging and forest fires by a lucky coincidence.

In 2019 Triarius suffered major fire damage in the January 2019 bush fires. While not reduced in height many of the branches and leaves dropped off and its survival was uncertain months later.

References

Individual eucalypts
Tourist attractions in Tasmania
Tasmanian forests
Southern Tasmania
Individual trees in Tasmania